Franco Morbidelli (born 4 December 1994) is an Italian Grand Prix motorcycle racer in MotoGP, riding for Monster Energy Yamaha MotoGP team. He became champion in the 2013 European Superstock 600 Championship, and the 2017 Moto2 World Championship.

Early life
Morbidelli was born in Rome to a Brazilian mother, Cristina, and an Italian father, Livio Morbidelli. The elder Morbidelli himself was a former motorcycle racer, finishing runner-up in the 80 cc and 125 cc classes of the Italian national championships. Livio Morbidelli recognized his son's potential from a young age but did not have the resources to support a racing career. Through an old racing companion Graziano Rossi, father of 9-time world champion Valentino Rossi, Livio Morbidelli learned of the motorcycle training hotbed in Tavullia. The family sold their home in Rome and moved to Tavullia to support Franco's race career ambitions. This training with Rossi became the precursor to what is now known as the VR46 Academy for racers, of which Morbidelli later became the first official member.

Despite the common misconception, he is not related to Giancarlo Morbidelli, manufacturer of the Morbidelli Grand Prix racing bikes, or his son, former Italian F1 driver Gianni Morbidelli. In January 2013, Morbidelli's father committed suicide.

Career

Early career
As a teen, Morbidelli was poised to enter the Spanish CEV 125cc championship, one of the main feeder series for a Grand Prix motorcycle career. However a lack of funding prevented him from entering, and he instead found a ride in the European Superstock 600 championship for 2011. Staying in the series for 2012, and 2013, Morbidelli got seat at Team Italia aboard a Kawasaki, for a third season in the class in 2013, ultimately winning the championship with two wins and three 2nd places.

Moto2 World Championship

Federal Oil Gresini Moto2 (2013)
As a result of his success in the Superstock championship, Morbidelli earned a place as a wild-card entry rider for Gresini in three rounds of the Moto2 championship. He did not score any points in the three races, finishing 20th in Misano, 18th in Japan, and 17th in Valencia.

Italtrans Racing Team (2014–2015)
Morbidelli joined the Moto2 class full-time in 2014 with the Italtrans Racing Team, and outscored his more experienced teammate and former 125cc Champion Julián Simón, finishing with 75 points compared to Simón's 56.

He stayed with the team in 2015, and got his first podium, a 3rd place finish, at the Indianapolis Grand Prix. He ended the season 10th in the standings, with 90 points.

EG 0,0 Marc VDS (2016–2017)
In 2016, he joined the Marc VDS Racing Team, partnering Álex Márquez. After a slow start, he finished the season strongly with five consecutive podium finishes, eight podiums in total (four 2nd places, and four 3rd places), and finished 4th in the standings, with 213 points.

For 2017, he was a favourite for the title and took his first win at the opening race at Qatar accordingly. He won a total of eight races during the season, with another additional four podium finishes, as he won the 2017 Moto2 World Championship with Marc VDS in the Malaysian GP, after his closest championship contender Thomas Lüthi was declared unfit for the Malaysian race, following a crash at qualifying.

MotoGP World Championship

EG 0,0 Marc VDS (2018)
Morbidelli moved up the MotoGP class in 2018, still with the Marc VDS team on a Honda bike, the 2017-spec Honda RC213V. He was partnered by his 2017 Moto2 title rival Thomas Lüthi, who failed to score a single point that season, on the same machinery. Morbidelli finished the season in 15th place with 50 points, four points ahead of Hafizh Syahrin on the Tech3 Yamaha, thus winning rookie of the year.

Petronas Yamaha SRT (2019–2021)
For 2019, as Marc VDS left the premier class, Morbidelli signed with the newly formed Petronas SRT team on a two-year deal to ride an "A-spec" satellite Yamaha alongside rookie Fabio Quartararo. With 115 points, he finished 10th in the riders' championship, finishing in the top ten point scoring places regularly.

Just before the delayed start to the 2020 season, Petronas SRT announced that Morbidelli had been signed on a further two-year deal, meaning he would stay with the team. In this season, Morbidelli was riding a 2019-spec Yamaha, while his team-mate Fabio Quartararo, rode a factory-spec Yamaha. In August 2020, at the Austrian Grand Prix, Morbidelli's motorcycle collided with that of Johann Zarco while the two fought through turn 2. Despite the dramatic crash which resulted in a red flag, Morbidelli was unharmed. He achieved his first MotoGP podium at the Czech round and his first victory just three races later, at his home race in Rimini. He took his second career win at the Teruel Grand Prix, setting a new track race lap record on the way, and solidifying himself as a contender for the riders' championship. At the following European Grand Prix, Morbidelli struggled in qualifying and then in the race, battling rising tire pressures, ultimately limping home in 11th, while title rival Joan Mir took his first career win, all but extinguishing Morbidelli's title hopes. At the second Valencia round the following week, Morbidelli bounced back to take his second career pole position and converted it to his third career win, staving off a last lap attack from Jack Miller. Mir finished in 7th place, sufficient to clinch the championship ahead of Morbidelli. At the final round in Portugal, Morbidelli finished the season with his fifth podium of the season, to end the championship as runner-up to Mir by 13 points.

For 2021, Morbidelli's teammate was the VR46 Academy owner Valentino Rossi. During the first half season, Morbidelli rode the 2020 "A-spec" Yamaha and took his first podium at Jerez, finishing third. After the German Grand Prix, Morbidelli injured his knee in a training accident and was unable to race at Assen when he was substituted by Yamaha World Superbike rider Garrett Gerloff, and the Styrian event in Austria by Yamaha factory tester Cal Crutchlow. Morbidelli's recovery was slow and he was replaced by Jake Dixon who rode Morbidelli's machine for the British Grand Prix race in August, and again at Aragón in September.

Monster Energy Yamaha MotoGP (2021–present)
During Morbidelli's rehabilitation, it was announced that he would move up to the factory Yamaha Motor Racing team for the rest of 2021 (starting from Misano), and also through 2022, officially replacing the vacated seat left by Maverick Viñales who was abruptly sacked by the team in August 2021. Morbidelli’s seat at the satellite Yamaha team was taken over by Andrea Dovizioso, who returned to the sport after a racing break and some test riding with Aprilia. After Morbidelli was deemed healthy enough to race by doctors, he returned to the championship on an unfamiliar bike, after missing five race weekends. This showed in his results, finishing in the points just twice in the season's last five races, ending the year 17th in the standings, with 47 points.

For the 2022 MotoGP World Championship, Morbidelli was partnered by old teammate, the reigning World Champion Fabio Quartararo at the Yamaha Motor Racing team.

Career statistics

FIM European Superstock 600 Championship

By season

By class

Races by year
(key) (Races in bold indicate pole position, races in italics indicate fastest lap)

Grand Prix motorcycle racing

By season

By class

Races by year
(key) (Races in bold indicate pole position; races in italics indicate fastest lap)

World Rally Championship results

References

External links

1994 births
Living people
Italian people of Brazilian descent
Italian motorcycle racers
Moto2 World Championship riders
Sportspeople from Rome
Marc VDS Racing Team MotoGP riders
Sepang Racing Team MotoGP riders
MotoGP World Championship riders
Yamaha Motor Racing MotoGP riders
21st-century Italian people
Moto2 World Riders' Champions